Two destroyers of the United States Navy have carried the name USS Abbot in honor of Commodore Joel Abbot.

 , was a  traded to the United Kingdom during World War II.
 , was a  that served during World War II and the Korean War.

References

United States Navy ship names